Ghoria subpurpurea is a moth in the family Erebidae. It is found in Taiwan.

Taxonomy
Ghoria Subpurpurea was treated as a subspecies Ghoria collitoides for some time.

References

Moths described in 1927
Lithosiina
Moths of Taiwan
Taxa named by Shōnen Matsumura